The Blohm & Voss P 197 was a design project during World War II for a single-seat twinjet fighter, in response to a requirement issued in 1944.

Design

The P 197 had a conventional layout overall, with the two Junkers Jumo 004 jet engines housed side by side within the fuselage and fed by flush intakes just ahead of the wing roots and on either side of the forward-mounted cockpit. The nose also accommodated the forward-firing cannon and the retractable nosewheel of the tricycle undercarriage.

The low-set wing was sharply swept with marked dihedral, and behind it a T-tail sat above the engine exhausts.

Armament comprised four forward-firing heavy-calibre guns or cannon.

Specification

References

Notes

Bibliography
 Hugh Cowin; "Blohm und Voss Projects of World War II", Air Pictorial, October 1963, pp. 312–316.
 David Masters; German Jet Genesis, Jane's, 1982, p. 29.

P 197
Abandoned military aircraft projects of Germany
World War II jet aircraft of Germany